A transient condensation cloud, also called a Wilson cloud, is observable surrounding large explosions in humid air.

When a nuclear weapon or a large amount of a conventional explosive is detonated in sufficiently humid air, the "negative phase" of the shock wave causes a rarefaction of the air surrounding the explosion, but not contained within it. This rarefaction results in a temporary cooling of that air, which causes a condensation of some of the water vapor contained in it. When the pressure and the temperature return to normal, the Wilson cloud dissipates.

Mechanism

Since heat does not leave the affected air mass, this change of pressure is adiabatic, with an associated change of temperature. In humid air, the drop in temperature in the most rarefied portion of the shock wave can bring the air temperature below its dew point, at which moisture condenses to form a visible cloud of microscopic water droplets. Since the pressure effect of the wave is reduced by its expansion (the same pressure effect is spread over a larger radius), the vapor effect also has a limited radius. Such vapor can also be seen in low pressure regions during high–g subsonic maneuvers of aircraft in humid conditions.

Occurrence

Nuclear weapons testing

Scientists observing the Operation Crossroads nuclear tests in 1946 at Bikini Atoll named that transitory cloud a "Wilson cloud" because the same pressure effect is employed in a Wilson cloud chamber to let condensation mark the tracks of electrically-charged sub-atomic particles. Analysts of later nuclear bomb tests used the more general term condensation cloud.

The shape of the shock wave, influenced by different speed in different altitudes, and the temperature and humidity of different atmospheric layers determines the appearance of the Wilson clouds. During nuclear tests, condensation rings around or above the fireball are commonly observed. Rings around the fireball may become stable and form rings around the rising stem of the mushroom cloud.

The lifetime of the Wilson cloud during nuclear air bursts can be shortened by the thermal radiation from the fireball, which heats the cloud above to the dew point and evaporates the droplets.

Non-nuclear explosions

Any sufficiently large explosion, such as one caused by a large quantity of conventional explosives or a volcanic eruption, can create a condensation cloud, as seen in Operation Sailor Hat or in the 2020 Beirut explosion, where a very large Wilson cloud expanded outwards from the blast.

Aircraft and Rockets

The same kind of condensation cloud is sometimes seen above the wings of aircraft in a moist atmosphere. The top of a wing has a reduction of air pressure as part of the process of generating lift. This reduction in air pressure causes a cooling, just as above, and the condensation of water vapor. Hence, the small, transient clouds that appear.

The vapor cone of a transonic aircraft or rocket on ascent is another example of a condensation cloud.

See also
 Mushroom cloud
 Rope trick effect
 Contrail

References

Aerodynamics
Physical phenomena
Explosions
Cloud types